Khlyut is a rural locality (a selo) and the administrative centre of Khlyutskoye Rural Settlement, Rutulsky District, Republic of Dagestan, Russia. The population was 2,069 as of 2010. There are 18 streets.

Geography 
Khlyut is located 139 km northeast of Derbent, 10 km southeast of Rutul (the district's administrative centre) by road. Zrykh is the nearest rural locality.

Nationalities 
Lezgins live there.

References 

Rural localities in Rutulsky District